Lietava is a village and municipality in Žilina District in the Žilina Region of northern Slovakia. Lietava Castle, the third largest castle in Slovakia, is in the village.

History
In historical records the village was first mentioned in the year 1300 AD.

Geography
The municipality lies at an altitude of 429 metres and covers an area of 10.005 km². It has a population of about 1450 people.

References

External links
http://www.obeclietava.sk
https://web.archive.org/web/20181111123615/https://www.hradlietava.sk/

Villages and municipalities in Žilina District